The Carnegie Library is a historic building still in use as the Hoquiam Timberland Library in Hoquiam, Washington.

Description
One of forty–three Carnegie libraries built in Washington, it is located at 621 K Street in Hoquiam. The Claude and Starck design is a rare example of Prairie School architecture in the region. The main facade faces southwest fronting K Street. A small central wing extends from the back. A detailed plaster frieze is below the eaves of the hip roof which extend about  all around the building. A buff Tenino sandstone course joins the frieze and brick which makes up the primary wall material. A central stairway on the main facade leads to the second floor where the main public interior space is situated. This space is a large open room divided by bookshelves.

History
The Hoquiam Carnegie Library was built in 1911, the architects were Louis W. Claude and Edward F. Starck (Claude and Starck) of Madison, Wisconsin. It was listed on the National Register of Historic Places in 1982. The building was substantially renovated and restored in 1991, funded by a $1.9 million city bond, a Bishop Foundation grant and bequeathments by local citizens. The project took great care to maintain the architectural and historic integrity of the building. On December 11, 2018 the library re–opened after a preservation and upgrade project.  the building is essentially unaltered and remains in use as a public library. The address for the modern library branch is listed as 420 7th Street.

See also
 Andrew Carnegie
 National Register of Historic Places in Grays Harbor County, Washington
 Tenino Stone Company Quarry

References

External links 
 
 
 

Library buildings completed in 1911
National Register of Historic Places in Grays Harbor County, Washington
Prairie School architecture in Washington (state)
Libraries on the National Register of Historic Places in Washington (state)
Buildings and structures in Grays Harbor County, Washington
1911 establishments in Washington (state)